1st Artillery Brigade may refer to:
1st Artillery Brigade (Japan)
1st Artillery Brigade (United Kingdom)